WE (sometimes stylized as "WE") is the sixth studio album by Canadian indie rock band Arcade Fire, released through Columbia Records on May 6, 2022. Produced by Nigel Godrich and band members Win Butler and Régine Chassagne, it was recorded in studios in New Orleans; in El Paso, Texas; and on Mount Desert Island in Maine. The album takes its name from the Russian dystopian novel We by Yevgeny Zamyatin. It was the final album by Arcade Fire to feature multi-instrumentalist Will Butler, who departed the band in 2022.

Preceded by the singles "The Lightning I, II" and "Unconditional I (Lookout Kid)", WE received generally positive reviews from music critics and achieved moderate commercial success. It debuted at number six on the US Billboard 200 chart, earning 32,000 album-equivalent units (26,500 of which were sales of the full album) in its first week of release, and went to number one in the United Kingdom, Ireland, the Netherlands, and Portugal. The album was nominated for Best Alternative Music Album at the 65th Annual Grammy Awards.

Background
In April 2020, Win Butler posted a letter to his Instagram account indicating that work on a new Arcade Fire album had commenced prior to the COVID-19 pandemic, and that the writing continued during the lockdown measures. He noted that he had written a song entitled "Age of Anxiety" before the pandemic, and that many of the themes he had begun to explore felt appropriate, given the circumstances surrounding the pandemic. Later that month, Butler shared some snippets of the new material.

On October 21, 2020, Butler commented about Arcade Fire's sixth album during an interview for the Broken Record podcast. The band had been writing for a year before the COVID-19 lockdown, and, during the lockdown, Butler kept working and wrote "two or three" new albums. Arcade Fire planned to record the album in Texas "during the election".

According to the producer, Nigel Godrich, WE was recorded "in the middle of nowhere" outside El Paso, Texas, during the COVID-19 lockdown. He said: "[We] basically lived in a cult for a couple of months. Nobody came in and nobody came out, people delivered the shopping, that sort of vibe just so we could be able to do it. It was a method to make it possible."

Composition
Musically, WE shifts "smoothly and deliberately" between "gentle" folk rock and "grooving" dance-pop.

The track “Unconditional II (Race and Religion)” features backing vocals by Peter Gabriel.

Promotion and release
On April 14, 2021, Arcade Fire released a 45-minute instrumental piece entitled "Memories of the Age of Anxiety" on the meditation app Headspace.

In March 2022, fans received postcards marked with the band's logo. The postcards included the note "WE missed you" above musical notations on the front, and an image of an eye with the word "Unsubscribe" written below it on the back. Those same images began to appear in signage around London and on the band's social media pages, indicating the album's impending release.

On March 14, the band announced that a new song titled "The Lightning I, II" would be released on March 17. In concert with the release of the single, it was announced that the album would be titled WE and released on May 6, 2022, and that it was produced by Nigel Godrich, Win Butler, and Régine Chassagne, and recorded in studios in New Orleans; in El Paso, Texas; and on Mount Desert Island in Maine. The cover artwork featuring a photograph by French artist JR with airbrush color tinting by Terry Pastor was also revealed. Later in March, Will Butler announced he had amicably left the band after the new album was completed in late 2021.

The day after the release of the album, the band appeared on Saturday Night Live. They played "Unconditional I (Lookout Kid)" and "The Lightning I, II", as well as "End of The Empire II" over the closing credits.

The album was released in Dolby Atmos.

Critical reception

WE was met with generally positive reviews from music critics. On Metacritic, it has a weighted average score of 73 out of 100 based on 29 reviews, indicating "generally favorable reviews". It was longlisted for the 2022 Polaris Music Prize and nominated for Best Alternative Music Album at the 65th Annual Grammy Awards.

Commercial performance
In the United States, the album debuted at number six on the Billboard 200, marking Arcade Fire's fifth top-ten debut on the chart. During its first week of release in the US, it earned 32,000 album-equivalent units, of which 26,500 came from sales of the full album, 5,000 came from 6.43 million on-demand official streams of songs from the album, and 500 came from 5,000 paid downloads of individual tracks from the album.

Track listing
All tracks written by Win Butler and Régine Chassagne; additional writing on "Unconditional II (Race and Religion)" by Will Butler.

Digital track listing

CD/vinyl track listing

Personnel
Adapted from the full album credits, with track numbers corresponding to the digital release.

Arcade Fire
 Régine Chassagne – keyboards, piano, accordion, backing and lead vocals, orchestral arrangements, production
 Win Butler – lead and backing vocals, guitars, bass, keyboards, piano, percussion, production
 Richard Reed Parry – electric guitar, bass guitar, backing vocals
 Tim Kingsbury – acoustic guitar, electric guitar, bass guitar, backing vocals
 Jeremy Gara – drums, percussion
 Will Butler – keyboards, bass guitar, backing vocals

Additional musicians
 Josh Tillman – "stomps and breaths" (track 1)
 Geoff Barrow – "granular synthesis" (track 2)
 Paul Beaubrun – sound effects (track 3, 4, 5)
 Owen Pallett – orchestral arrangements, strings (tracks 4, 5, 6, 7, 8)
 Sally Herbert – conductor, additional arrangements (tracks 2, 4, 5, 10)
 Helen Gillet – strings (tracks 4, 5, 8)
 Harry Hardin – strings (tracks 4, 5, 8)
 Matt Rhody – strings (tracks 4, 5, 8)
 Andre Michot – accordion (tracks 4, 5, 6, 7, 8)
 Liza Rey – harp (tracks 4, 5, 10)
 Charlie Gabriel – saxophone (tracks 4, 5)
 Mark Braud – trumpet (tracks 4, 5)
 Wendell Brunious – trumpet (tracks 4, 5)
 Sarah Neufeld – strings (tracks 6, 7)
 Louis Michot – fiddle (tracks 6, 7, 8)
 Orlando Primo – congas, djembe (tracks 8, 9)
 Peter Gabriel – additional vocals (track 9)
 Willonson Duprate – congas (track 9)
 Romeo Bougere – agogô bell (track 9)
 Michael Brun – "additional synthesis" (track 9)
 Everton Nelson – additional strings
 Natalia Bonner – additional strings
 Ian Burdge – additional strings
 Louisa Fuller – additional strings
 Richard George – additional strings
 Marianne Haynes – additional strings
 Oli Langford – additional strings
 John Metcalfe – additional strings
 Tom Piggott Smith – additional strings
 Rachel Robson – additional strings
 Lucy Wilkins – additional strings
 Chris Worsey – additional strings
 Edwin Farnham Butler IV – "whispers" ("End of the Empire")
 

Production
 Nigel Godrich – production, mixing
 Eric Heigle – co-producer (tracks 1, 2, 8, 9), recording
 Josh Tillman – additional production (tracks 1, 2)
 Geoff Barrow – additional production (track 2)
 Mikko Gordon – additional production (track 5), recording, mixing assistant
 Steve Mackey – pre-production
 Emily Eck – recording
 Suvi-Eeva Äikäs – additional recording (track 2)
 Julia Simpson – additional recording (track 2)
 Owen Pallett – additional recording (tracks 6, 7)
 James Seymour – additional recording (track 6, 7)
 Mark Lawson – additional recording (track 9)
 Jerry Ordonez – recording assistant 
 Marco Ramirez – recording assistant 
 Justin Tocket – recording assistant 
 Matt Aguiluz – recording assistant 
 Nathanael Graham – recording assistant 
 Francesca Edwards – recording assistant 
 Joy Stacey – recording assistant 
 Pablo Godin – recording assistant 
 Felipe Gutierrez – recording assistant 
 Craig Silvey – mixing
 Dani Bennett Spragg – mixing assistant
 Greg Calbi – mastering 
 Steve Fallone – mastering
 Ryan Smith – vinyl mastering

Artwork
 JR – cover image, WE poster image, additional eye photography
 Terry Pastor – airbrush color tinting 
 Ping Pong Ping – album graphic design
 Julia Simpson – album creative production
 Alison Green – center image and polaroids
 IV – "I Guy" Character, handwriting
 Camille Pajot – studio art director
 Marc Azoulay – producer
 Rick Rose – digitech
 Fabien Barrau – cover image photo post-production
 Chroma Center – photo printing, post-production
 EHT Collaboration – "Black Hole" image
 Danny Clinch – David Bowie photograph
 Pneuhaus – "Giant Eye"
 Maria Jose Govea – additional photography
 JF Lalonde – additional photography
 Wes Winship – "Acropolis Is Burning" poster
 Don Hertzfeldt – still from World of Tomorrow: Episode 2 
 Gift Horst Tintypes – WE poster photo development

Charts

Weekly charts

Year-end charts

References

2022 albums
Arcade Fire albums
Columbia Records albums
Albums produced by Nigel Godrich